The King Ferdinand I National Military Museum, located at 125-127 Mircea Vulcănescu St., Bucharest, Romania, was established on 18 December 1923 by King Ferdinand I. It has been at its present site since 1988, in a building finished in 1998.

In film
The 2018 film I Do Not Care If We Go Down in History as Barbarians was partially shot on the museum premises, both inside and in the yard.

Gallery of exhibits

References

External links 

Museums established in 1923
Museums in Bucharest
Military and war museums in Romania
Museums of Dacia
1923 establishments in Romania